Donald Cameron of Lochiel (c. 1695 – 1748), popularly known as the Gentle Lochiel, was a Scottish Jacobite and hereditary chief of Clan Cameron, traditionally loyal to the exiled House of Stuart. His father John was permanently exiled after the 1715 Rising and when his grandfather Sir Ewen Cameron died in 1719, Donald assumed his duties as Lochiel of the Camerons. 

Despite considerable misgivings, Lochiel's support for Prince Charles Edward Stuart proved pivotal in the early stages of the 1745 Jacobite Rising. The Camerons held a strategic importance out of proportion to numbers due to the compact nature of their lands and ability to act as a cohesive unit; in contrast, many of their rivals were scattered across different areas and riven by internal feuds.

Defeated and wounded at the Battle of Culloden, Lochiel and Prince Charles escaped to France, fleeing from Lochaber in late 1746, in company with other senior Jacobites. He was appointed Colonel of the Régiment d'Albanie and commander of the Garde Écossaise by Louis XV. Lochiel was also made a member of Order of Saint Michael. He died in Bergues, French Flanders on 23 October 1748.

Life

Donald Cameron was born in either 1695 or 1700. His father John Cameron, Lord Lochiel (1663–1748) participated in the 1708 attempt, as well as the 1715 and 1719 Risings. As a result, he spent the rest of his life in exile and when Sir Ewen Cameron died in 1719, Donald became acting clan chief and was thereafter known as Lochiel.

Lochiel had four brothers; John Cameron of Fassiefern (1698–1785), Alexander (1701–1746), Archibald (1707–1753) and Evan (1708–1750). Alexander was a Jesuit priest, who was captured at Culloden and died of disease awaiting trial; Archibald escaped with Lochiel in 1746 but was arrested when he returned to Scotland in 1753 and executed at Tyburn in June. Evan Cameron was a planter on the family estate in Jamaica. His sister Margaret (1695-ca 1760) married Ranald MacDonald of Kinlochmoidart (died 1725), another prominent Jacobite family.

In 1729, Lochiel married Anne Campbell (1707-after 1748), who like his mother Isobel (1675–1748) came from a Jacobite branch of the Campbell clan and they had three sons and four daughters. After 1745, his home Achnacarry was destroyed and property confiscated; John Cameron, 20th Lochiel, was allowed home in 1759 but the Cameron estates were not restored until 1784.

Career

Pre-1745
In the decades following the failed 1719 Rising, Highland society and economy became more integrated with the outside world but remained one of the poorest areas of Europe. Poverty was particularly marked in the Western Isles and Lochaber, made worse by fines imposed after the 1715 Rising; this led to abuses such as the sale of tenants into indentured servitude by MacDonald of Sleat and Norman MacLeod.

Highland chiefs traditionally rented land to tacksmen, often relatives, who provided men for military service as part of their rent. However, the military aspects of clanship had been in decline for many years, the last significant inter-clan battle being Maol Ruadh in August 1688 which meant paying for a capacity that was rarely used. In 1737, the Duke of Argyll abolished the tacksman role, instead renting lands to the highest bidder. Lochiel allegedly wished to do the same but was prevented from doing so by James Stuart, the Old Pretender, who wished to retain this military capability. 

One lesson learned by the central government after the failed 1719 Rising was their continuing reliance on clan chiefs to control the Highlands. To offset this, between 1725 to 1738, George Wade built a network of military roads, connecting garrisons at Fort Augustus, Ruthven Barracks and Fort William, first built by Cromwell in 1654 to control Cameron lands in Lochaber. These reduced the power of Jacobite chiefs like Lochiel, Glengarry, Clanranald, Keppoch and Appin; combined with their dire financial position, by 1743 they were reportedly faced with "selling their land or conforming."

Largely dormant since 1719, Stuart prospects revived in 1740 when the War of the Austrian Succession placed Britain against France, who sought ways to divert British resources from the key battlefield in Flanders. Lochiel and six colleagues, including his father-in-law Sir James Campbell, formed an association committing to support a Stuart restoration but only with French military backing. In late 1743, Louis XV proposed a landing in England to restore the Stuarts; Prince Charles traveled to Dunkirk to join the invasion force but the plan was abandoned in March 1744 after the French fleet was severely damaged by winter storms. Charles suggested an alternative landing in Scotland; in August, he met Jacobite agent Murray of Broughton in Paris, telling him he was "determined to come ...though with a single footman".

The 1745 Rising

After Murray shared this with the Jacobite Buck Club, Lochiel and others signed a declaration urging Charles not to do so, unless he brought 6,000 French troops, money and weapons. When Charles landed on Eriskay in July, Lochiel refused to meet him but was eventually persuaded, although his brother John Cameron of Fassefern warned emotion would prevail over his judgement. This proved correct and Lochiel's commitment persuaded others, including his cousin Macpherson of Cluny, who deserted from Loudon's Highlanders before Prestonpans. The process took over three weeks and Lochiel finally did so only when Charles gave him a personal guarantee for "the full value of his estate should the rising prove abortive," and Glengarry provided a written undertaking to raise the Macdonalds.

Lochiel's decision was not a surprise to John Cameron or Duncan Forbes, senior government legal officer in Scotland. This suggests it was largely emotional, although his own account claims he did so 'after fruitless attempts to persuade [Charles] to go back where he came from.' It is often claimed the government forced him into it by ordering his arrest but there is little evidence this was a factor; warrants for Lochiel, Glengarry, Clanranald and others were issued in late June, a month before Charles landed and not executed. The reluctance of the Jacobite chiefs to participate was well-known and preventive detention a commonly used means for providing sympathisers an excuse not to do so.

The ability of clan chiefs to quickly mobilise large numbers of men derived from 'regalian rights' giving them wide-ranging powers over their clansmen and Lochiel's commitment obliged his tenants to take up arms. Those who did not were whipped or threatened with eviction, a process supervised by Archibald Cameron and allegedly a factor in his betrayal by Cameron clansmen when he returned to Scotland in March 1753.

The Rebellion was launched at Glenfinnan on 19 August; the initial Jacobite force consisted of 900 to 1,100 men, mostly Camerons and MacDonalds, including Lochiel's nephew, Donald MacDonald of Kinlochmoidart (1705–1746). While Lochiel had no military experience, he proved a competent regimental commander and the Camerons one of the more reliable Jacobite units. His initiative was credited for the bloodless capture of Edinburgh in September, while the Camerons also fought at Prestonpans, a battle lasting less than 15 minutes. It was notable for a furious argument between Charles and Lord George Murray, the senior Scottish commander, whose fractured relationship became increasingly evident as the campaign progressed.

Prestonpans surprised both the government and Jacobites, who spent the next six weeks debating next steps. For the Irish exiles who accompanied Charles, only a Stuart on the throne of England could give them the autonomous, Catholic Ireland promised by James II & VII in 1689. For the Scots, their primary objective was to dissolve the 1707 Union; Lochiel's nickname 'Gentle' came from his insistence there be no reprisals against their opponents in Edinburgh, a sensible approach for anyone wishing to establish an independent Scotland. They had little interest in invading England and were unconvinced by Charles' personal qualities.

Strategy was determined by the War Council, dominated by the West Highland chiefs who provided the bulk of the Jacobite army, including Lochiel, Keppoch, Clanranald, Glengarry and Stewart of Appin. They agreed to invade England on 31 October but with deep reluctance and on condition Charles' claims to have received assurances of English and French support were forthcoming. The failure of these to materialise led to the Council voting to retreat at Derby but the real damage was the admission by Charles he had lied at Edinburgh. Lochiel remained silent out of deference to Charles during the meeting but was among the overwhelming majority who approved it.

The army crossed back into Scotland, entering Hamilton on 23 December; an anonymous resident later described the Camerons, Macphersons and MacDonalds as 'an undisciplined, ungovernable army of Highland robbers, who took no notice of their commanders.' On 8 January, the Jacobites besieged Stirling and defeated an attempt by Henry Hawley to relieve the garrison at Falkirk on 17 January. Despite this, on 1 February they abandoned Stirling and retreated north to Inverness, while Lochiel took his regiment north to invest Fort William, still held by government troops. They abandoned the siege to rejoin the main army in time for the Battle of Culloden on 16 April; the Camerons suffered heavy losses attacking the government left, while Lochiel was severely wounded and carried off the field.

Defeat ended the rising; Lochiel later claimed the Duke of Cumberland offered him and his clansmen terms if they handed in their weapons and surrendered but he rejected them. In late May, he, Lord George Murray, Murray of Broughton, John Roy Stewart and others met near Loch Morar to discuss options but there was little enthusiasm for continuing the fight. Lochiel, Archibald Cameron and Charles were sheltered by Cluny until picked up by a French ship in September.

Exile and Reputation

Prior to 1743, few viewed the Stuarts as a useful tool and even those who did saw little value in restoring them to the British throne. By 1747, they had become an obstacle to peace negotiations and the French ignored appeals from Charles and Lochiel for another attempt. The unofficial French envoy in Scotland, d’Éguilles, described Lochiel as "virtuous, intelligent and influential" but was so critical of Charles he recommended France consider establishing a Scots Republic instead.

Lochiel was appointed colonel of the Régiment d'Albanie by Louis XV and made a member of the Order of Saint Michael; he was also knighted by Charles. Lochiel succeeded his father, who died in 1747, as 2nd Lord Lochiel in the Jacobite peerage. He never returned to Scotland and died at Bergues on 26 October 1748, where he is buried in the Communal Cemetery. He was succeeded by his son John, who was allowed home in 1759 but died in 1762; the family estates were restored in 1784.

The nickname 'Gentle Lochiel' originated after his death and while acknowledged as a man of honour and principle, his tenure proved disastrous for his clan and relatives. The Camerons suffered heavy losses at Culloden, his nephew Donald was killed, his brother, Father Alexander Cameron, died while incarcerated in a prison hulk anchored in the River Thames in 1746 and the family's properties were either destroyed or confiscated. When Archibald Cameron of Lochiel returned in 1753 as part of the Elibank Plot, he was allegedly betrayed by fellow members of Clan Cameron who were, 'sickened by his Jacobitism.' His biographer John Gibson quotes a local proverb about the unusually fair Lochiel; 'it will be a sad day for Lochaber when there is next a fair-haired Lochiel.'

Family 
Lochiel married Anne Campbell, eldest daughter of James Campbell of Auchinbreck, 5th Baronet and Lady Janet MacLeod, daughter of John Breac MacLeod, 18th Chief. They had the following issue:

 John Cameron, 20th Lochiel (1732–1760), succeeded his father as chief in 1748
 Captain James Cameron (1736–1759), officer of the French service

 Charles Cameron, 21st Lochiel (1737–1776), succeeded his brother John as chief in 1760
 Lady Janet Cameron 
 Lady Henrietta Cameron, married Captain Jean Portin of the French service
 Lady Isabel Cameron, married Colonel Alexandre Mores of the French service

In popular culture 

 Lochiel appears as a character in D. K. Broster's novel The Flight of the Heron (1925), whose hero Ewen Cameron of Ardroy is a fictional cousin of his.

Notes

References

Sources

External links 
 

Scottish soldiers
1695 births
1748 deaths
Jacobite military personnel of the Jacobite rising of 1745
Scottish Jacobites
Scottish emigrants to France
French Army officers
French military personnel of the War of the Austrian Succession
Donald
Lochiel, Donald Cameron, 2nd Lord